Heo Kwang-hee (born 11 August 1995) is a South Korean badminton player who was educated at the Dankook University. He was selected to join the national team in 2012, and joined the Samsung Electro-Mechanics team in 2014. Heo was the bronze medalists at the 2012 World Junior Championships in the boys' singles and team event, and Asian Junior Championships in the team event. Heo later won the boys' singles and mixed team gold medals at the 2013 World Junior Championships, and the mixed team silver medal at the Asian Junior Championships. In the senior level tournament, Heo was the semi-finalists at the 2017 U.S. and 2018 New Zealand Open. He competed at the 2018 Asian Games and at the 2020 Summer Olympics, is best known for upsetting top-seeded Kento Momota in the group stage of the latter tournament.

Achievements

World Junior Championships 
Boys' singles

BWF World Tour (1 runner-up) 
The BWF World Tour, which was announced on 19 March 2017 and implemented in 2018, is a series of elite badminton tournaments sanctioned by the Badminton World Federation (BWF). The BWF World Tour is divided into levels of World Tour Finals, Super 1000, Super 750, Super 500, Super 300 (part of the HSBC World Tour), and the BWF Tour Super 100.

Men's singles

References

External links 
 
 Heo Kwang-hee at the www.samsungsem.com

1995 births
Living people
Sportspeople from Daejeon
South Korean male badminton players
Badminton players at the 2020 Summer Olympics
Olympic badminton players of South Korea
Badminton players at the 2018 Asian Games
Asian Games competitors for South Korea